D. Srinivas, also known as Veena Srinivas (born 12 September 1968) is an Indian veena player of Carnatic music.

Early life and background
Srinivas was born in Hyderabad, Andhra Pradesh, to Tulasi, a popular veena player. He travels extensively for his concerts.

Career
Srinivas gave his maiden concert at the age of 9 for All India Radio, Hyderabad.
He is a top grade Veena artist and received Ugadi Visishta puraskaram by the chief minister of Andhra Pradesh. Performing Prestigious Veena concerts all over India and Abroad since 25 years. He is the only Veena artist who performed at the UN.

Awards and honours
 Emani Sankara Sastry award
 Chittibabu Memorial award
 Gidigu Lalitha Memorial award
 Ugadi Visishta Puraskaram from Government of Andhra Pradesh.

Titles
 Veena Vidhwamani
 Veena Praveena
 Raaga Sudhakara
 Vainika Ratna
 Vainika Samraat
 Vainika Chakravarthy
 Veena Sambrahma

Discography
 Tyagaraja Krithis on Veena 
 Indian Classical Ringtones

References

External links
 official site

1968 births
Living people
Musicians from Hyderabad, India
Saraswati veena players